Middlesbrough Rugby Union Football Club is an English rugby union team. One of two clubs of the area of Middlesbrough, the club runs five senior sides and ten junior teams.

The initial club was formed in 1872, but it was not until 1892 when the current name was introduced. The club plays at Acklam Park, having moved there in 1930, and currently have a ground-share with Middlesbrough Cricket Club.

History

The first recorded club match took place on 16 November 1872 against Northumberland, playing at Newcastle. The final results score was Northumberland 28–0 Middlesbrough. The earliest Derby game known was Middlesbrough 10–0 Darlington, which took place at Breckon Hill road on Grove Hill on 15 February 1873. Between 1873 and 1879 is unknown, with the debut Middlesbrough team later defunct. Following this, a Middlesbrough Rovers team was formed. Teesside Wanderers was founded in 1881. Until 1892, Middlesbrough continued to support their 2 clubs until that year came when the Rovers lost their ground. Middlesbrough RUFC was then officially formed.

The club had previously played at several different grounds, before eventually settling down at a new home on Green Lane, Acklam Park, in 1929; the official ground name was not decided until 1930. In 1933, the local Middlesbrough Cricket Club joined the ground, becoming joint-owners. For the 2012–13 season in the North 1 East, the club finished in 11th place, one place above the relegation zone, with 45 points. They were later relegated to Yorkshire 1 the following season, in 12th place, with just 50 points being achieved. In the 2014–15 season, Middlesbrough played in Yorkshire 1. They played two consecutive seasons in Durham/Northumberland 1, when they were transferred to that league, before being transferred back to Yorkshire 1.

In 2015, Barker and Stonehouse, Twitter, Charles Clinkard and Carlsberg agreed to sponsor Acklam Park, as well as the club. Facing the first team pitch, there is an all-seated stand, though it is bench seating that is used rather than seats, as it was cheaper at the time. However, there are seats facing the cricket pitch, which is connected to the right side of the clubhouse, with players walking out of the changing rooms onto the pitch forward. In 2017, the cricket club allowed the youth teams of the rugby club to use their pitch, due to the rugby club needing to use the main ground, rather than the main junior ground, Tollesby Road, as the grass was not cut. After the grass at Tollesby was cut, the youth teams from the under-7s to under-12s moved back to Tollesby. There are currently plans to have their stand converted into an all-seater stand, instead of using bench seating, there will be plastic seats used.

The 2019–20 season was a major blow for the club: they were transferred back to Durham/Northumberland 1 due to geographical reasons and a major cut in player numbers within their youth system saw their status as a club deteriorate. Lack of players led to their "Colts" side merge with Stockton to become "Teesside Colts" and their under-16s squad merge with Acklam to become "Teesside United".

Current squad

Past seasons

Notable events
 In 1947, the first team shattered the 1931–32 season record of 19 wins and 409 points, by notching 22 victories from 29 games and totalling 516 points with only 128 against.
 In 1955, numbered shirts were introduced for the first team squad.
 In 1960, the first ever post-war tour took place with matches against Chester, Birkenhead Park and the District XV.
 From 1962 until 1963, there was a 12-week lay-off because of snow.
 In 1963, Phil Horrocks-Taylor joined the club, a Cambridge blue and England international player, who became the first player to go down in international program as being from Middlesbrough.

Club honours
Yorkshire Cup champions (1976)
North 2 (east v west) playoff champions (2004)
North Division 2 East champions (2007)

Notable former players

Men

Scotland internationalists

The following former Middlesbrough players have represented Scotland at full international level.

England internationalists

The following former Middlesbrough players have represented England at full international level.

References

External links
Official club website

English rugby union teams
Rugby clubs established in 1872
Sport in Middlesbrough
1872 establishments in England